Mikhail Romanov (born October 29, 1989, Leningrad) is a Russian political figure and a deputy of the 8th State Duma. 

After graduating from the Northwestern Management Institute, Romanov worked at the State Duma as an assistant to the deputy of the 5th State Duma Viktor Zubarev. In 2009, he founded the Foundation for the Promotion of Science, Education, Culture and the Implementation of Social Programs "Northern Capital". From 2016 to 2021, Romanov served as a deputy of the 7th State Duma. In September 2021, he was re-elected for the 8th State Duma from the Saint Petersburg constituency.

In 2018, Romanov was criticized for the lack of meaningful activities as a deputy from the Saint Petersburg constituency. The same year, former drivers from the "Northern Capital" foundation accused Romanov of leaving them without payment.

References

1984 births
Living people
United Russia politicians
21st-century Russian politicians
Eighth convocation members of the State Duma (Russian Federation)
Seventh convocation members of the State Duma (Russian Federation)